Andrea Sala (born 27 December 1978 in Gallarate) is a retired Italian volleyball player. As of 2010 he had 87 caps for Italy national volleyball team.

References

External links
 

Italian men's volleyball players
Sportspeople from the Province of Varese
1978 births
Living people